lululemon athletica inc. (styled in all lowercase) is a Canadian multinational athletic apparel retailer headquartered in British Columbia and incorporated in Delaware, United States. It was founded in 1998 as a retailer of yoga pants and other yoga wear, and has expanded to also sell athletic wear, lifestyle apparel, accessories, and personal care products. The company has 574 stores internationally, and also sells online.

History 

Lululemon was founded in 1998 by Chip Wilson in Vancouver, with its first standalone store opening in November 2000. Wilson created the name to have many L's so that it would sound western to Japanese buyers, who often have difficulty pronouncing the letter. He later remarked that he found it "funny to watch [Japanese speakers] try and say it" and that "it was the only reason behind the name".

The company's initial public offering was in July 2007, raising $327.6 million by selling 18.2 million shares. Christine Day, a former co-president of Starbucks, became chief executive officer in 2008.

In 2013, the company made its third consecutive appearance on Fortunes Fastest-Growing Companies list. In December 2013, founder Chip Wilson announced his resignation as chairman, and that the president of TOMS Shoes, Laurent Potdevin, would become CEO.

In 2014, Lululemon opened its first store in Europe, a flagship shop in Covent Garden, London. In February 2015, Wilson announced that he was resigning from the board, and that Michael Casey, former lead director of the board, would replace him. In 2018, Laurent Potdevin resigned as CEO and from the company's board due to misconduct.

From its founding through 2015, Lululemon incorporated elements of Landmark Forum into its leadership and development training. According to a company source, seventy per cent of managers are hired internally. Store managers are responsible for their store's layout, color coordination, and community involvement.

In 2019, Lululemon announced an investment in MIRROR, a fitness startup that sells an interactive mirror with a camera and speakers for at-home workouts. The companies planned to create new content for the device, starting with meditation classes. In June 2020, Lululemon announced a $500 million deal to purchase MIRROR, capitalizing on a growing trend of people conducting virtual workouts at home instead of going to a gym due to the COVID-19 pandemic.

Products 
Lululemon sells athletic wear including tops, yoga pants – a product that the company invented, shorts, sweaters, jackets and undergarments, as well as hair accessories, bags, yoga mats, water bottles, and personal care products such as deodorant and dry shampoo. Lululemon trademarked its original fabric, Luon, which included a higher-than-average amount of nylon microfiber, in 2005. Since then, the company has produced several different types of fabrics, including compression and moisture-wicking designs. Lululemon is primarily known for their leggings, which first made the brand popular.

Lululemon maintains a research and development lab, "Whitespace," within its headquarters. It has around 50 employees including scientists and physiologists.
	
In 2019, the company launched a luxury streetwear brand called Lab in a few of its stores. In the same year, the company announced plans to double its men's business in the next five years beyond its women's and accessory business, competing against other athletic wear such as Nike and Under Armour.

Marketing 

Originally known for women's yoga apparel, by 2019 Lululemon had grown by acquiring more male customers and adapting its product and marketing strategies accordingly; it plans to increase awareness of its brand among men.
The company has been stated to use "holistic guerrilla marketing", aiming to make customers feel that by wearing Lululemon clothing they are part of a larger community.
It uses social media including Facebook, Twitter and Instagram as a main method of marketing the company and its products. Lululemon offers fitness instructors 25 percent off their orders.

Controversies 

In November 2007, The New York Times reported that Lululemon made false claims about its Vitasea clothing product; the firm had claimed that the clothing, made from seaweed, provided "anti-inflammatory, antibacterial, hydrating and detoxifying benefits" but laboratory tests failed to find significant differences in mineral levels between ordinary T-shirt cotton and Vitasea fabric. Lululemon was subsequently forced to remove all health claims from its seaweed-based products marketed in Canada, following a demand from a Canadian oversight agency, the Competition Bureau of Canada.

In 2013, some customers complained that the clothing was of poor quality, with some items being "too sheer", having holes appear, and falling apart after a few uses. 
In December 2010, Lululemon recalled some of the store's reusable bags that were made from polypropylene, based on reports of high levels of lead. 
In 2013, Lululemon recalled its black yoga pants that were unintentionally transparent and "too thin"; the recall, which amounted to approximately 17 percent of all women's pants sold in its stores, impacted its financial results. The resulting financial loss and damage to the brand led to the forced departure of the company's Chief product officer, Sheree Waterson, and of its CEO, Christine Day.

Founder Chip Wilson has made numerous controversial statements. In a 2004 interview, Wilson mocked Japanese pronunciation of the company's name. In 2013 he said that the company did not make clothes for plus-size women because it was too costly. In an effort to explain away excessive pilling in the brand's clothing, he blamed some customers for wearing Lululemon's clothes improperly or for having body shapes inconsistent with his clothes. In an interview for Bloomberg TV in 2013, he stated that some women's bodies were unsuitable for the brand's clothing. Time called the remarks "fat shaming". Comments such as these reportedly led to Wilson's resignation as chairman. In June 2016, Wilson published an open letter to shareholders stating that the company had "lost its way" and given up market share to Nike and Under Armour, after he was denied the opportunity to speak at the company's annual meetings. Since then, Wilson has used his website "Elevate Lululemon" to criticize the brand and business.

In 2012, Lululemon filed a lawsuit against Calvin Klein and supplier G-III Apparel Group for infringement of three of its design patents for yoga pants. The lawsuit was somewhat unusual as it involved a designer seeking to assert intellectual property protection in clothing through patent rights. The case was settled out of court the same year.

In 2021, a Business Insider report revealed that an unnamed company director pushed employees to create an All Lives Matter campaign to be displayed on its website in response to the murder of George Floyd. Employees pushed back but were told to move forward and create a mock up with the All Lives Matter copy, however they also created a Black Lives Matter artwork mock up that in the end was selected instead. The director apologized to 200 members of the company over conference call and subsequently left the company.

In September 2022, 1,698 yoga teachers and students via advocacy groups Stand.earth and Actions Speaks Louder wrote to the company demanding a transition to 100% renewable energy by 2030. They claimed that roughly half of the firm's energy came from coal production.

See also 
 Lululemon murder

References

External links 

 

 
1998 establishments in British Columbia
2007 initial public offerings
1990s fashion
2000s fashion
2010s fashion
2020s fashion
Canadian companies established in 1998
Clothing brands of Canada
Clothing companies established in 1998
Clothing retailers of Canada
Companies based in Vancouver
Companies formerly listed on the Toronto Stock Exchange
Exercise equipment companies
Multinational companies headquartered in Canada
Retail companies established in 1998
Sportswear brands
Underwear brands
Yoga merchandise